Zale'n-gam or Zalengam (Thadou-Kuki) dialect for 'land of freedom'), is a proposed state by Kuki people, with the intention of uniting all the Kuki tribes under a single government. The proposed state's main proponents are the Kuki National Organisation and its armed wing, the Kuki National Army. 

Zalengam is distinct from Kukiland, a proposed Indian state to be carved from the hilly area of the southern part of Manipur.

Territory and people
The territorial claims of Zale'n-gam encompass a historical region consisting of the territories traditionally inhabited by the Kukis, but which never have had their own state, including:
In India: Parts of Manipur, Mizoram, Nagaland and the Karbi Anglong District of Assam.
In Burma: The Kabaw Valley and parts of Sagaing Division and Chin State.
In Bangladesh: The Chittagong Hill Tracts

There is also a proposal to create two subdivisions of the proposed state: 'Eastern Zalengam' and 'Western Zalengam', the former within Burma and the latter in India.

Kuki tribes that would be part of this proposed state include the Bom, Biate, Gangte, Halam, Hmar, Kharam, Koireng, Kom, Lai, Mara, Purum, Saihriem, and the Thadou, among others.

See also
Kuki Inpi

References

Independence movements
Kuki tribes
Proposed countries